Mobvoi Information Technology Company Limited is a technological company headquartered in Beijing, China that sells and develops consumer electronics and Chinese voice recognition, natural language processing, and vertical search technology in-house.

The core team members include ex-Googlers, AI experts, former Nokia employees, engineers and researchers from top universities such as Johns Hopkins, Harvard, MIT, Cambridge, and Tsinghua or top-tier Internet companies such as Yahoo Beijing, Baidu, Tencent, etc. Since inception, Mobvoi has raised 5 rounds of funding led by Sequoia Capital, ZhenFund, SIG, Perfect Optronics Ltd (HK listed), GoerTek (A- Share listed) and Google with total fundraising amount of US$75 million.

History 

Mobvoi was founded in October 2012 by Zhifei Li. In May 2013, Mobvoi released their Voice Search Service featured in the popular messaging app, WeChat. In 2014, Mobvoi launched their independent voice search app called Chumenwenwen, which covers over 60 vertical domains, providing various types of everyday information.

In 2014, Mobvoi released their own Android-based smartwatch operating system, TicWear OS by Google 1.0. Mobvoi partnered with Frog Design to release TicWatch. In June 2015, Mobvoi launched TicWatch in China featuring TicWear 3.0. The TicWatch has been ranking first in sales for Android smartwatches in China, second to Apple Watch on platforms such as JD.com, Tmall, Suning, and Amazon. TicWatch has 100K+ users and 100M+ sales.

Wear OS by Google formed a strategic partnership with Mobvoi to work together on the efforts to bring Wear OS by Google to China. Moto 360 is the first Wear OS by Google device in China to carry Chinese voice search and voice controls powered by Mobvoi. Mobvoi launched Mobvoi Store, which is official Wear OS by Google partner in China.

In  2016, Mobvoi launched TicAuto, an AI enabled mirror for automobiles. CES 2016 showcased Ticauto and Ticmirror in the automotive field innovations section.

In June 2016, TicWatch 2 was launched on JD crowdfunding platform and sold over RMB 12 million within 11 days. On July 25, 2016, Mobvoi launched TicWatch 2 Global Edition on Kickstarter. The Kickstarter achieved its goal of US$50 thousand in less than ten minutes. The campaign generated over 2 million in support in less than 29 days. In April 2017, According to the reports, Mobvoi launched chatbot that can communicate with voice-activated smart home devices.

Products

Chumenwenwen Mobile Voice Search 
Chumenwenwen is a voice-activated AI assistance app available on Android and iOS devices. It enables searches in over 60 vertical fields of interest. It provides users the ability to ask it for directions, restaurant suggestions, news, and weather information, among many other options. In 2014, Chumenwenwen became the official voice service provider for Wear OS by Google users in China.

TicAuto 
TicAuto is an in-vehicle voice app, integrating speech recognition, semantic analysis, vertical search, TTS and other advanced technology to provide voice navigation, POI search, instant messaging, and on-board entertainment.

TicMirror and TicEye 
TicMirror  is an in-car robot integrating Mobvoi's voice engine. TicMirror allows users to perform everything they could with TicAuto and more with the addition of 7.84-inch touch screen that doubles as a rear view mirror. It has a 160-degree wide-angle lens allowing it to be used as a 1080p dashcam. TicMirror is compatible with TicEye, which is an Advanced Driver Assistance System (ADAS) enable front collision warning and lane departure warnings.

TicWatch and TicWatch 2 Global Edition 
TicWatch is Mobvoi's first attempt at creating a smartwatch powered by their TicWear OS by Google operating system. TicWatch is compatible with Android and iOS devices. It can be used as a standalone fitness tracker and has built in GPS and heart rate sensor chipsets. TicWatch was initially introduced for the market in China. Ticwatch 2 Global Edition was later launched for the global users on Kickstarter. The version released in China features an eSim data connection. This feature is removed from the Global Edition due to complications with cellular partners. The Kickstarter raised over 2 million dollars in funding.

TicWatch S and E 
The TicWatch S and E models are Mobvoi's second attempt at crowdfunding a smartwatch device on Kickstarter. The devices are powered by Google's Wear OS by Google 2.0 operating system instead of Mobvoi's Ticwear OS, making the models the company's first Wear OS by Google devices. The Kickstarter raised over 3 million dollars with more than 19,000 backers.

TicWatch Pro 
The TicWatch Pro was released in mid-2018 running Google's Wear OS by Google. It features a layered display, mixing an AMOLED and LCD screen to extend the battery life. It has two modes of operation. At "Smart Mode", the LCD is always on when wearing and the AMOLED activates for regular Wear OS by Google usage. This should give 2–5 days of battery life. At "Essential Mode", Wear OS by Google is shut down, and only the LCD is active, only featuring time, date, heart rate, steps and battery display. In this mode, up to 30 days of battery life is expected.

The watch comes with NFC (supporting Google Pay), GPS or AGPS, accelerometer, gyro, magnetic sensor, PPG heart rate sensor, ambient light sensor and low latency off-body sensor. It is rated as IP68 water and dust resistance.

In 2020 the TicWatch Pro was upgraded to the TicWatch Pro 2020, which retained most of the original model's specifications but doubled the RAM capacity to 1Gb, and added improved durability.  In early 2021, a subsequent upgrade was released, the TicWatch Pro S, which again had a very similar specification to its predecessors, but featured improved sports and health tracking capabilities. An error in a press release given to the media led many to report that the storage capacity had been doubled to 8GB, but Mobvoi confirmed that this was not the case and the internal storage capacity remained at 4GB as on the two previous TicWatch Pro models.

TicWatch C2 
The TicWatch C2 was released in H2 2018.

Ticwatch S2 and E2 
The Ticwatch S2 and E2 were announced at CES 2019 and were released on 22 January 2019. The two watches are identical except for the design. The S2 design is certified for MIL-STD-810G military-grade durability, while the E2 design is not. 

Both are powered by the Snapdragon Wear 2100 SOC commonly used by other Wear OS smartwatches. The S2 & E2 both have plastic cases, heart rate sensors, 415 mAh batteries, and built in GPS. They run Wear OS by Google and have a few Mobvoi apps pre-installed including TicHealth and TicExercise. The lugs use standard quick release spring bars and can be swapped with other straps including those sold by Mobvoi. They have a microphone but no speaker. They do not have NFC for contactless payments nor an ambient light sensors for automatic brightness. They use the same proprietary magnetic charger by Mobvoi which is built to fit the watches exactly. They include 512 MiB of RAM and 4 GiB of storage (although quite a lot of that is used up by the operating system and pre-installed apps).

TicWatch Pro 3 GPS 
The TicWatch Pro 3 GPS was launched in September 2020. It's the second watch in Mobvoi's Pro lineup, the TicWatch Pro (2020) being the first. It operates on Google's Wear OS, just like other smartwatches from Mobvoi.

Coming to the specifications, it is powered by Qualcomm's Snapdragon Wear 4100 Platform which makes it the first Wear OS watch to use the 4100 chipsets. It uses a dual-display technology, where the main display is an AMOLED display while the second one is a low power FSTN screen. The 1.4" AMOLED display is protected by Gorilla Glass 3 and comes with an IP68 water resistant rating.

The dimensions of this watch are 47 x 48 x 12.2 mm. It has a 22 m replaceable silicon straps. It contains minimal battery capacity of 577 mAh and nominal battery capacity of 595 mAh.

The TicWatch Pro 3 GPS comes with 1GB RAM and 8GB storage. The sensors include Blood O2 saturation level, night infrared static heart rate sensor, accelerometer, barometer, gyroscope, ambient light sensor and GPS.

For this smart watch Mobovoi launched new applications like TicHearing, TicZen, TicOxygen and TicBreathe while older applications like TicSleep, TicPulse and TicExercise were updated.

TicWatch Pro 3 Ultra GPS 

The TicWatch Pro 3 Ultra GPS comes with Snapdragon 4100+ cpu.

References

External links 

 
 

Software companies of China
Companies based in Beijing
Chinese brands